It may refer to:

Diamond Jubilee Higher Secondary School, Gobichettipalayam, India
Diamond Jubilee High School, Mumbai, India
Platinum Jubilee High School, Warangal, India